This is the discography for the solo work of rock musician Kristin Hersh.

Albums

Studio albums

Live albums

EPs

Singles

Hersh
Hersh